This is a list of The Basil Brush Show episodes. The Basil Brush Show was a British television show that aired from 2002 to 2007.

Series overview

Series 1 (2002)

Series 2 (2003)

Series 3 (2004)

Series 4 (2005)

Series 5 (2006)

Series 6 (2007)

 Georgina Leonidas was present for two episodes due to filming of the then new Harry Potter film.

References 

Lists of British children's television series episodes
Lists of British comedy television series episodes